Norway Glacier is an Antarctic tributary glacier about 10 nautical miles (18 km) long, descending the polar plateau just west of Mount Prestrud, and flowing northeast to enter Amundsen Glacier between Mount Bjaaland and Mount Hassel, in the Queen Maud Mountains. Named by Advisory Committee on Antarctic Names (US-ACAN) in association with the many features named in this area for members of Amundsen's Norwegian expedition of 1910–12.

References

Glaciers of Amundsen Coast